Sri Vengateswaraa Polytechnic College is a technical college located in Vennanthur, Namakkal, Tamil Nadu. The college was founded in 2007 with the goal of educating poor students.

Programs
The college offers degrees in the following subjects:

 Civil engineering 
 Mechanical engineering 
 Electrical and electronics engineering 
 Electronics and communication engineering 
 Information technology 
 Computer science and engineering

Sri Vengateswaraa Matriculation Higher Secondary school

The school run by the Sri Ragavendra educational trust.

References

External links
 

Education in Namakkal district
Engineering colleges in Tamil Nadu
Vennandur block